Headin' for Broadway is a 1980 American drama film directed by Joseph Brooks and written by Joseph Brooks, Larry Gross, and Hilary Henkin. The film stars Rex Smith, Terri Treas, Vivian Reed, Paul Carafotes, Gary Gendell and Benjamin Rayson. The film was released in May 1980, by 20th Century Fox.

Plot

Four young hopefuls from different parts of the country head to Broadway for a shot at stardom.

Cast 
Rex Smith as Fast Eddie
Terri Treas as Carrie Richards
Vivian Reed as Valerie Walker
Paul Carafotes as Ralph Morelli
Gary Gendell as Gary
Benjamin Rayson as Singing Coach
Dick Boccelli as Mr. Morelli
Anthony Cafiso as Brother
Vera Lockwood as Mrs. Morelli
Mario Mariani as Vic
Lisa Goodman as Gloria
Herman O. Arbeit as Desk Clerk 
Charles Brown as Pimp
Gene Foote as Jay Weston
Ed Morgan as Ed Reeves 
Lonny Price as Steven Levy
Reza Sefavi as Equity Rep1
Carol Hamilton as Mitzi Jackson
Larry Hochman as Rehearsal Pianist
Tracy Fitzpatrick as Lucy Richards
James Congdon as Mr. Richards
Lenka Peterson as Mrs. Richards
Michael Conforti as Jimmy
Jean Foster as Kitty Walker 
Eliza DeCroes as Carla

References

External links 
 

1980 drama films
1980 films
20th Century Fox films
American drama films
Films about actors
Films about musical theatre
Films about theatre
1980s English-language films
1980s American films